Newcastle University School of Architecture, Planning and Landscape is based in Newcastle upon Tyne, England. Housed in a Grade 2 listed building in the university quadrangle (built in 1913 to a design by WH Knowles and adjacent to the School of Fine Art by the same architect). Its history predates the establishment of the university.

History
From the second half of the 19th century the Northern Architectural Association developed architectural courses in conjunction with the RIBA. These were held as evening classes for articled pupils in the School of Fine Art at Armstrong College in Newcastle, the forerunner of King's College, then the Newcastle Division of Durham University. King's College was established in 1937 and subsequently separated by Act of Parliament in 1963 to form Newcastle University.

Notable staff 
 Bruce Allsopp
 Thomas Sharp, town planner, academic in the school 1937–1945, devised the world's first degree in town planning 1943, president of the Town Planning Institute 1945

Notable alumni 
Harry Faulkner Brown, MC
Jack Lynn
Gordon Ryder
Alison & Peter Smithson
William Whitfield
David Rock, RIBA President 1997-99
Alan Plater, playwright
Terry Farrell 
Richard Murphy
Eric Parry
Peter Exley, AIA President 2021
Mark Dytham, inventor of PechaKucha
George Clarke

External links

References 

Architecture schools in the United Kingdom
Newcastle University